St. Philip's may refer to:

 St. Philip's, Newfoundland and Labrador, Canada
 Rural Municipality of St. Philips No. 301, Saskatchewan, Canada
 St. Philip's Church, Brunswick Town, former church in North Carolina; listed on the National Register of Historic Places
 St. Philip's Castle, a fortress
 St. Philip's Cathedral, Birmingham, a Church of England cathedral
 St Philip's Church, Sydney
 St. Philip's School, a grammar school
 Bristol St Philip's railway station
 St Philip's Footbridge, a bridge in Bristol

See also
 Saint Philip (disambiguation)
 St. Philip's College (disambiguation)
 St. Phillip's, Kingston, Tortola, British Virgin Islands